Henrik Jensen is the name of:

Henrik Jensen (footballer born 1959), Danish football player and manager
Henrik Jensen (footballer born 1978), Danish football player
Henrik Jensen, Danish jazz bassist and member of the Puppini Sisters
Henrik Jensen (historian), Danish historian and writer, born 1947
Henrik Wann Jensen, computer scientist